Sera Motebang (born 1 May 1995) is a Mosotho professional footballer who plays as a forward for Royal AM  and the Lesotho national team.

Career statistics

International

International goals
Scores and results list Lesotho's goal tally first.

References

External links
 

1995 births
Living people
Lesotho footballers
Lesotho expatriate footballers
Lesotho international footballers
Association football forwards
Matlama FC players
Bloemfontein Celtic F.C. players
Royal AM F.C. players
Lamontville Golden Arrows F.C. players
South African Premier Division players
Expatriate soccer players in South Africa
Lesotho expatriate sportspeople in South Africa
People from Maseru